Nils Kulstad may refer to:
 Nils M. Kulstad, Norwegian farmer, savings bank director and politician
 Nils Isachsen Kulstad, Norwegian politician.